The terms transition town, transition initiative and transition model refer to grassroot community projects that aim to increase self-sufficiency to reduce the potential effects of peak oil, climate destruction, and economic instabilitythrough renewed localization strategies, especially around food production and energy usage. In 2006, the founding of Transition Town Totnes in the United Kingdom became an inspiration for other groups to form. The Transition Network charity was founded in early 2007, to support these projects. A number of the groups are officially registered with the Transition Network. Transition initiatives have been started in locations around the world, with many located in the United Kingdom and others in Europe, North America and Australia. While the aims remain the same, Transition initiatives' solutions are specific depending on the characteristics of the local area.

Etymology
The term, "transition town" was coined by Louise Rooney and Catherine Dunne.

The transition model can be applied to different types of places where people live, such as villages, regions, islands and towns. The generic term is "transition initiative", which includes transition neighborhoods, communities, and cities, although "transition town" is in common usage.

History

From Kinsale to Totnes

In 2004, permaculture designer Rob Hopkins set his students at Kinsale Further Education College the task of applying permaculture principles to the concept of peak oil. The output of this student project was the ‘Kinsale Energy Descent Action Plan'.

This looked at across-the-board creative adaptations in the realms of energy production, health, education, economy and agriculture as a "road map" to a sustainable future for the town. Two of his students, Louise Rooney and Catherine Dunne, developed the Transition towns concept.  They then presented their ideas to Kinsale Town Council. The councilors decided to adopt the plan and work towards energy independence.

Hopkins moved to his hometown of Totnes, England, where he and Naresh Giangrande developed these concepts into the transition model.  In early 2006, Transition Town Totnes was founded and became the inspiration for founding of other Transition initiatives.

Transition Network founded

In early 2007, the Transition Network UK charity was co-founded by permaculture educator Rob Hopkins, Peter Lipman and Ben Brangwyn. Totnes based, it was initiated to support the Transition initiatives emerging around the world. It trains and supports people involved with the initiatives. It also disseminates the concepts of transition towns.

2008 to present day
In 2008, the number of communities involved in the project had increased with many localities in the process of becoming "official" Transition towns. This was also the year that the Transition Handbook was published.

The initiative spread and by May 2010 there were over 400 community initiatives recognized as official Transition towns in the United Kingdom, Ireland, Canada, Australia, New Zealand, the United States, Italy and Chile. The term transition initiatives became common to reflect the range and type of communities involved – e.g. villages (Kinsale), neighbourhoods of cities (Portobello, Edinburgh), through council districts (Penwith) to cities and city boroughs (Brixton).

By September 2013, there were 1130 initiatives registered (462 Official, 654 Muller) in 43 countries.

Influences
Influences include permaculture concepts as described in Bill Mollison’s Permaculture, a Designers Manual (1988) and David Holmgren’s Permaculture: Principles and Pathways Beyond Sustainability (2003), as well as David Fleming's work on community, culture and resilience.

Organization
Each transition town or initiative has a high level of autonomy. However, to be called an official initiative certain criteria must be met. Additionally, there is nothing to stop an 'unofficial' initiative using ideas inspired by Transition towns. Further, there are various 'hubs' to coordinate work at a regional level.

Transition Network
The Transition Network (TN) is a UK charity set up to support Transition initiatives. It has published books and films, trained people and facilitated networking. The TN's website contains a listing of the initiatives that have registered, some of which are officially recognised.

Some of the material has been translated and adapted to other languages/cultures, including Portuguese, Danish, German, Dutch, Spanish, French, Hungarian, Italian, Japanese and Irish.

TN has run seven conferences: Nailsworth (2007), Royal Agriculture College, Cirencester (2008), Battersea Arts Centre (2009), Dame Hannah's at Seale Hayne (2010), Hope University, Liverpool (2011), Battersea Arts Centre (2012) and Dame Hannah's at Seale Hayne (2015).

Transition US
In the United States, transition initiatives have been started in many communities. Transition US is the national hub. Its stated vision is "that every community in the United States will have engaged its collective creativity to unleash an extraordinary and historic transition to a future beyond fossil fuels; a future that is more vibrant, abundant and resilient; one that is ultimately preferable to the present".

The stated aim of Transition US is to be a resource and "catalyst for building resilient communities across the United States that are able to withstand severe energy, climate, or economic shocks while creating a better quality of life in the process". They plan to accomplish this by "inspiring, encouraging, supporting, networking and training individuals and their communities as they consider, adopt, adapt, and implement the transition approach to community empowerment and change".

A large number of state sites have also been set up using the Ning social networking platform. These state sites, under the umbrella of a national Ning site, were set up to help facilitate, network, inform, monitor, and house regional and organizational transition initiatives.  Thus, furthering the spread of the transition movement while networking related organizations, projects, ideas and activities.

Guidance for new groups
Some projects use the TN's guide the '12 ingredients', or the 'revised ingredients', when setting up their group.

Features
The Transition Network's (TN) stated aim is to promote awareness of sustainable living and building local ecological resilience.

Peak oil and local resilience
The Transition Handbook: From Oil Dependency to Local Resiliency by Rob Hopkins provides much of the framework behind the Transition Initiative and outlines ways for local Transition Towns to get involved.

Transportation

Communities are encouraged by The Transition Network to seek out methods for reducing energy usage as well as reducing their reliance on long supply chains that are totally dependent on fossil fuels for essential items (see environmental calculator).

Food production
According to The Transition food is a key area for transition, sometimes the slogan "Food feet, not food miles" is used. Initiatives so far have included creating community gardens or replacing ornamental tree plantings with fruit or nut trees to grow food.

Waste and recycling
Business waste exchange seeks to match the waste of one industry with another industry that uses that waste material, sometimes referred to as industrial symbiosis. It is suggested that this process can help companies increase profitability by reducing raw material and waste disposal cost, reducing carbon emission, making their by-products a source of revenue to be bought by other business. It also suggests that repairing old items rather than throwing them away should be considered.

Psychology
The Transition Network proposes an alternative from business as usual, or from 'shocked/doomladen' reactions to peak oil and an end to unlimited economic growth. According to Southend-on-Sea in Transition,

by shifting our mind-set we can actually recognise the coming post-cheap oil era as an opportunity rather than a threat, and design the future low carbon age to be thriving, resilient and abundant — somewhere much better to live than our current alienated consumer culture based on greed, war and the myth of perpetual growth."

A theme of the Transition Network is acknowledging the emotional impact of changing to a low energy world. Some Transition Network groups have 'Heart and Soul' groups to look at this aspect.

Energy descent action plans (EDAP)

Transition towns aim  to reduce dependency on fossil fuels, and one way they do this is by developing a community Energy descent action plan (EDAP). As shown in the case of Totnes, the term "community" is broadly defined to include local people, local institutions, local agencies and the local council.  Development of an EDAP requires the active engagement of local initiatives at a variety of levels. The first comprehensive plan was created for Totnes in 2010, entitled Transition in Action: Totnes & District 2030.

In France, where the movement is called Villes et Territoires en Transition, the association négaWatt provides a theoretical support to the transition movement.

Economics

After the 2008 global financial crisis, the Transition Network added financial instability as further threat to local communities (alongside peak oil and climate change). It suggested a number of strategies could help, including fiscal localism and local food production. Further, it sees the creation of local complementary currencies as reinforcing moves toward sustainable low carbon economies as well as being socially beneficial. Additionally, Hopkins also wrote that the movement does have an understanding of global economics and is critical of its systemic problems such as being "growth-based".

Some transition towns have been involved in launching local currencies including the Totnes pound, the Lewes pound, the Stroud pound and the Brixton pound.

To help further these aims the Transition Network setup up the REconomy Project, circa 2012.

Launched in 2007, the Totnes pound, which was redeemable in local shops and businesses, helped to reduce food miles while also supporting local firms.

In 2008, the idea was also considered by three Welsh transition towns, including Cardiff.

The Stroud pound and Totnes pound became defunct in 2013 and 2019 respectively. As of November 2019, the Lewes pound and Brixton pound are active.

In popular culture
Transition towns have been featured in the plot line of the long-running BBC Radio 4 series The Archers. This is an example of mainstream media attention the movement received a few years after being founded.

Publications

Books
A number of books have been published on specific topics, including: how communities can develop their Transition town initiative. Unless stated, the following books were published as a collaboration between Green Books and the Transition Network (under the label Transition Books):

 The Transition Handbook: from oil dependency to local resilience (2008) – by Rob Hopkins
 The Transition Timeline: for a local, resilient future (2009) – by Shaun Chamberlin
 Local Food: how to make it happen in your community (2009) – by Tamzin Pinkerton and Rob Hopkins
 Local Money: how to make it happen in your community (2010) – by Peter North
 Local Sustainable Homes: how to make them happen in your community (2010) – by Chris Bird
 Communities, Councils and a Low Carbon Future What We Can Do If Governments Won't (2010) – by Alexis Rowell
 Transition in Action: Totnes & District 2030 – an EDAP (2010) Transition Town Totnes – (scripted) by Jacqi Hodgson with Rob Hopkins
 The Transition Companion: making your community more resilient in uncertain times (2011) – by Rob Hopkins
 The Power of Just Doing Stuff (2013) – by Rob Hopkins

In 2008, the Transition Handbook was the joint 5th most popular book taken on holiday during the summer recess by the UK parliamentary MPs.

Films
Two films have been created by the movement about the movement. They document the progress of various initiatives:

In Transition 1.0 (2009)
In Transition 2.0 (2012) Emma Goude (Director), Transition Network and Green Lane Films (Production)

Critique and research 
In 2008, the Trapese Collective published a critique called The Rocky Road to a Real Transition to which Hopkins replied. The debate was partly about how social change is brought about.

A number of academic papers have been published looking at the concept's progress:

See also

 Carfree city
 Circles of Sustainability
 Climate change
 Community currencies
 Degrowth
 Electric vehicle
 Energy descent
 Fairtrade Town
 Food swap
 Great Transition
 New Economy movement
 Peak oil
 Petitions
 Permaculture
 Renewable electricity
 Solidarity economy
 Sustainable city
 Transition management (governance)
 Urban vitality

Books
 Surviving the Future
 Power Down
 Winning the Oil Endgame

Organisations
 Green Drinks
 Open Source Ecology
 New Economics Foundation
 New Economy Coalition

References

External links
Transition Network
Transition United States
REconomy Project

Community development
Economic development
Environmentalism
Peak oil
Climate change
Self-sustainability
Sustainable communities
Totnes
Simple living
Articles containing video clips